Bangladesh Air Force Shaheen College Chattogram (BAFSC) is a school and college in Chattogram, Bangladesh. It is situated at Bangladesh Air Force base Zhahurul Haque. It is one of the six Bangladesh Air Force Shaheen Colleges operated by Bangladesh Air Force

History 
BAF Shaheen College Chittagong was established in 1978 by the Bangladesh Air Force. It added a higher secondary section in the 1985–86 academic year. In 2006, English-medium instruction in the National Curriculum and Textbook Board (NCTB) curriculum was introduced for classes 2 through 5.

Campus 

The college is located in the Bangladesh Air Force's Jahurul Haque Base in Chittagong, in the airport area of Patenga Thana.

It has a playground fields on its front and in the east side. It has a new building of five stories that is combined with the old building. Every year an inter shaheen football competition is held here.

Classrooms and others 

BAF Shaheen College Chattogram has projector enabled classrooms. All new classrooms now has projectors installed. CCTV runs all over the campus.

BAFSC has a library in its 2nd floor run by Liberian and   his assistant. There are four types of labs in BAFSC.They are computer, physics, chemistry and biology for both college and school level students. Generally teachers run the labs and helps students to do practical lessons on their subjects.

Teaching and other activities

Academics
 Science
 Commerce
 Arts

Teaching type

BAFSC teaches  with both boys and girls  together   . There are different sections in each class. Every section is named after the big and notable rivers of Bangladesh like Padma, Meghna, Jamuna, Karnaphuli, Madumati, Tista, etc. There are two types of curriculum right now in BAFSC, Bangla and English (National) Curriculum.

Cultural activities
For enriching the co-curricular activities, various clubs like Debate club, Recitation club, Music club, Drawing club, Spoken club, Spelling club, Mathematics club, Drama club, Sports and games club, Science club, Computer club, Literary association, Fine arts club etc are available in this institution. Besides, to flourish the latent talent of every individual student, the college arranges “Inter House wall magazine competition” in every four months and every year Shaheen College Souvenir “Shaheen” is published regularly. The institution is devoted in building up honest, ideal and conscious citizens of the country.
Also BAFSC arrange cultural programs on national occasions and school reasons.
On national occasions like Victory day, Independence day, International Mother Language Day etc. Every year BAFSC also  arranges annual prize giving ceremony after the annual sports day  . Many high-ranking officers of Bangladesh Air Force always attend the celebrations.

References

External links
 Official website

Colleges in Chittagong